"Today" is a song by English band Talk Talk released in June 1982 and is the third single from their debut album The Party's Over. It was the band's first top 20 hit and was their second ever biggest hit, peaking at number 14 on the UK Singles Chart.

Versions 
The 7" version of "Today" is a slight edit of the album version. However, this is not mentioned anywhere on the release. It was included on the 1997 compilation The Very Best of Talk Talk, entitled "Today (Single Version)".

The 12" B-side song, "It's So Serious", is from a BBC radio session, recorded for the David Jensen Show in November 1981, and was produced by John Sparrow. Similar to the 7" single, there is no mention of the fact that "Today" is an extended version or that "It's So Serious" is from a BBC radio session.

In the Netherlands, "It's So Serious" was released as the A-side, with "Today" as the B-side.

Track listings 
7": EMI / EMI 5314 (UK)

 "Today" – 3:13
 "It's So Serious" – 3:19

12": EMI / 12 EMI 5314 (UK)

 "Today" – 4:27
 "It's So Serious" – 4:16

Charts

References 

1982 songs
1982 singles
Talk Talk songs
Song recordings produced by Colin Thurston
Songs written by Mark Hollis (musician)
EMI Records singles